Elizabeth Owen Lowrey is an American interior designer, and principal and director of interior architecture at Elkus Manfredi Architects.

Lowrey gained a Bachelor of Interior Architecture degree in 1983 from Auburn University.  She was hired by Elkus Manfredi in 1988 as the firm's first employee, and became a principal in 2002.

Recent projects she has led have included an office for Boston Art at Seaport District, a headquarters for Draper Laboratory, the New Brunswick Performing Arts Center, and a "boutique hotel" called The Verb.

In 2018 she and David Manfredi were jointly awarded the Robert S. Swain Jr. Distinguished Service Award of the Real Estate Finance Association (REFA).

In 2019 she received an Honorary Doctorate in Fine Arts from the Massachusetts College of Art (MassArt).

She is a frequent contributor to industry publications. Among her recent articles are the following:

Banker & Tradesman (28 August 2022) "Design is Good Business"

In Magazine, (9 January 2022) "Good Intentions"

Boston Business Journal (1 September 2021) "How to create a workplace for lifelong learning"

Design Observer (3 September 2021) "The Workplace Recalibrated"

Fast Company (2 June 2021) "The Surprising Way to Build a Productive Organization"

Commercial Observer (12 May 2021) "Office Users Should Embrace a Flexible Post-COVID Setup"

Boston Business Journal (April 23, 2021) "Getting There:  A Four Step Process to Identifying Your Hybrid Work Model"

References

Year of birth missing (living people)
Living people
21st-century American women artists
American women interior designers
Auburn University alumni